David Sutherland Nelson (December 2, 1933 – October 21, 1998) was a United States district judge of the United States District Court for the District of Massachusetts.

Education and career

Born in Boston, Massachusetts, Nelson received a Bachelor of Science degree from Boston College in 1957 and a Juris Doctor from Boston College Law School in 1960. He was in private practice in Boston from 1960 to 1973. He was an assistant professor for the Boston University School of Public Communications from 1966 to 1973. He was a United States Commissioner of the United States District Court for the District of Massachusetts from 1968 to 1969. He was an instructor at Harvard Law School from 1969 to 1980, and an instructor in trial advocacy at the Boston University School of Law from 1973 to 1992. He served as an assistant commonwealth attorney general, specifically as Chief of Consumer Protection Division of Massachusetts from 1971 to 1973, and as a justice of the Superior Court of Massachusetts from 1973 to 1979.

Federal judicial service

On January 25, 1979, President Jimmy Carter nominated Nelson to a new seat on the United States District Court for the District of Massachusetts created by 92 Stat. 1629. He was confirmed by the United States Senate on March 21, 1979, and received his commission on March 23, 1979. He was the first African American to be appointed a federal judge in Massachusetts. He assumed senior status due to a certified disability on September 27, 1991, serving in that capacity until his death on October 21, 1998, in Framingham, Massachusetts.

See also 
 List of African-American federal judges
 List of African-American jurists

References

Sources
 

1933 births
1998 deaths
African-American judges
Boston College alumni
Boston College Law School alumni
Boston University faculty
Harvard Law School faculty
Judges of the United States District Court for the District of Massachusetts
Massachusetts state court judges
Massachusetts Superior Court justices
People from Roxbury, Boston
United States district court judges appointed by Jimmy Carter
20th-century American judges
20th-century American lawyers